"How to Save a Life" is the twenty-first episode of the eleventh season of the American television medical drama Grey's Anatomy, and is the 241st episode overall. It aired on April 23, 2015 on ABC in the United States. The episode was written by showrunner Shonda Rhimes and directed by Rob Hardy, making it the first episode Rhimes has written since the season 8 finale "Flight". The installment marked the death of the series’ male lead character, Derek Shepherd (Patrick Dempsey), who had starred on the series since its inception.

In this episode, Shepherd is involved in an accident while attempting to help the victims of a car accident. He is later pronounced brain dead, in part due to the surgeons not providing him with a timely CT scan. Only 6 regular cast membersEllen Pompeo, Patrick Dempsey, Chandra Wilson, Kevin McKidd, Sarah Drew and Caterina Scorsone appear in the episode. "How to Save a Life"  also marks the first appearance of Dr. Penelope Blake (Samantha Sloyan).

The episode's original broadcast was watched by 9.55 million viewers and registered the show as the week's highest-rated drama and third-highest rated scripted series in the 18–49 demographic. It received mixed reviews from critics upon release, who were divided on the show's handling of Shepherd's death. However, they were largely laudatory of Pompeo, with critic Rick Porter deeming it the best performance of her career.

Plot
The episode opens with a flashback of a five-year-old Meredith Grey (Ellen Pompeo) lost in a park. In the present, Dr. Derek Shepherd (Patrick Dempsey), is on his way to Washington to resign from the President's brain mapping project. He witnesses a road accident and pulls over to help the victims. He rescues a young girl named Winnie (Savannah Paige Rae) and helps her mother, who has a dislocated leg. With assistance from Winnie, he rescues another couple involved in the accident.

Paramedics arrive at the scene and transport the victims to a nearby medical facility at Dillard. Just as Derek is about to drive away, he is hit by a semi-truck, and is rushed to the ER at the closest hospital. He is unable to speak as the doctors examine him, with him subconsciously telling the doctors to order a head CT. However, Shepherd is rushed into surgery. One of the surgical residents, Dr. Penelope Blake (Samantha Sloyan), who wants to perform a CT is dismissed by her attending and by the time the doctors discover his blown pupil, Shepherd realizes that he will die. He is eventually declared brain-dead after the neurosurgeon arrives too late.

Grey is brought to the hospital by the police authorities and is informed by the surgeons that Shepherd is brain dead; she immediately points out that they should have ordered a head CT, much to Blake's dismay. She reviews all of her options with the doctor in-charge of Shepherd's case, before signing the papers to authorize the removal of his life support. Blake tearfully apologizes to a forbearing Grey, who then returns to Shepherd's room to say a final goodbye. This is accompanied by a montage of the heyday from their relationship.

Production
"How to Save a Life" was written by showrunner Shonda Rhimes and directed by Rob Hardy. It was the first episode that Rhimes had written since the show's season eight finale "Flight". Filming took place both at the studio in Los Angeles and outdoor locations over a span of three weeks. Samantha Sloyan, Larry Cedar, Mike McColl, Allie Grant, and Savannah Paige Rae made guest appearances in the episode; Sloyan reprised her role in the show's 250th episode "Guess Who's Coming to Dinner" and was subsequently promoted to a recurring character for the twelfth season. The soundtrack for "How to Save a Life" featured covers, recorded by Sleeping at Last, of such previously used tracks as "Today Has Been OK", originally by Emilíana Torrini and "Chasing Cars", originally by Snow Patrol, and the originals "Sedona" by Houndmouth, "Gulls" by David Gray, and "Into the Fire" by Erin McCarley.

Speculation about Dempsey's exit from Grey's Anatomy began in November, 2014, when Dempsey casually mentioned during an interview that he might be leaving the series very soon. Despite signing on for two more years at the end of the tenth season of the show, he disclosed that he would make his final appearance in the eleventh season. The official statement was released on April 23, 2015, just a few hours before the airing of "How to Save a Life". Dempsey went on to share further details on his character being written out of the show, saying that it happened very quickly and in an organic way. The developments leading up to the impending exit, he said, had begun in February, 2015.

Amidst speculation of a rift between Dempsey and Pompeo, and the showrunner Rhimes, Dempsey maintained his stance of leaving in a "very good" place with his co-star of ten years. In an interview with Entertainment Weekly, Dempsey explained that if his exit had been a result of a conflict with the production team, it would have had happened at the end of the tenth season, when his previous contract had expired. He added that though the death of the character might be viewed as a surprising decision, he "[liked] the way it has all played out." On his relationships with Pompeo, he said: "it’s beautiful. We’re like a married couple [it has been] 10 years, and it was magic from the beginning”  Rhimes asserted on the importance of Dempsey's character in the statement she released at his departure: 
 
Pompeo posted on Twitter to react to the death of Shepherd, writing that she was honored and excited to tell Meredith's story "in the face of what feels like the impossible". She encouraged fans to continue watching the series, saying, "I hope you will all join me on her journey.” It was the first time that Pompeo spoke publicly about Dempsey's much publicised exit.

Reception

Broadcast
"How to Save a Life" was originally broadcast on April 23, 2015 in the United States on the American Broadcasting Company (ABC). The episode was watched by a total of 9.55 million, up 23 percent from its last years telecast airing around the same time. In the key 18-49 demographic, the episode scored a 2.8 in Nielsen ratings, up 22 percent from last year, scoring the best ratings since the eleventh-season premiere. It was the second best TV show in the 8.00 pm slot, beating Bones, The Vampire Diaries and a rerun on The Blacklist, but was beaten by The Big Bang Theory.

The 9.55 million people tuned into the episode marked a 24 percent increase from the previous episode (7.60), in addition to the installment's 2.8 Nielsen rating in the target 18–49 demographic marked a 33 percent increase from the previous episode (2.1). The Nielsen score additionally registered the show as the week's highest rated drama and third-highest rated scripted series in the 18–49 demographic, only behind CBS's The Big Bang Theory (3.6) and ABC's Modern Family (3.0).

Critical reception 
The episode received mixed reviews by critics who had polarizing views on the writing and handling of Shepherd's death.

Ashley Bissette Sumerel of TV Fanatic gave the episode the highest praise in a 5 out of 5 star review highlighting the "interesting possibilities" that the death would offer for the show. However, she stated, "I'm beyond heartbroken. [...] We've seen tragic deaths and lost beloved characters, but never quite like this. I don't think I'll ever get over it." She also acknowledged the show's emotional connect with its audience and its courage to attempt the "inconceivable". Ariana Bacle of Entertainment Weekly took the opportunity to reminisce the early years of the show saying that it is the compelling characters that have made committing to Grey's "irresistible". She added that despite some "weak moments" that the series suffers from, characters like "Meredith or Derek or Webber will have a moment that reminds me why I keep watching, why I never stopped— so watching one of those characters die hurts. It really, really hurts." In a mixed review for the episode, a Spoiler TV writer criticized the plot calling it a "self-indulgent episode", contrasted it with "well crafted departure of Mark Sloan, or by Lexie Grey". Also criticizing the absence of the series' major cast from the episode the review said, "The presence of so many inconsequential and uninteresting characters was continually in danger of swamping the dreaminess of Derek." However, appreciative of Pompeo's character, the reviewer remarked, "the writing of Meredith was completely on point. She was clinical, as we would expect her to be."

Pompeo garnered widespread acclaim from television critics for her performance in the episode; Rick Porter of Zap2it was largely laudatory of Pompeo's performance which he thought "made all the difference in the episode". He wrote highly of her role in the arc saying, "Without Meredith, and without one of Pompeo's strongest performances in her long time on the show, "How to Save a Life" would have run the risk of coming across as a baldly manipulative death episode". He noted that although it might not be the "ideal Emmy-submission episode" for Pompeo, because of the amount of time that she spent on screen, it was among the best work she's ever done on the show." Robert Bianco of USA Today thought of the episode as "a showcase for Pompeo", agreeing that although she didn't play a prominent part until the later half of the episode, but some memorable and well-played scenes: "from her angry response to the doctor who tries to tell her what her choices are, to her resignation when she realizes she has to comfort and motivate the young doctor whose mistakes cost Derek his life." Alexandria Ingham Guardian Liberty Voice was also impressed with Pompeo’s "range of emotions", which she described similarly, as going through many stages, including anger, resignation compassion.

Shepherd's death came as a shock to the audience and was a major topic of discussion among critics, who gave polarising views on the character's exit. Janalen Samson, a contributing Writer for BuddyTV noted the episodes generation of shock in the times of the omnipresent media saying, "Genuine surprise is a rare occurrence in television viewing these days", and added, "Imagine my amazement, then, when I sat down to watch [...] "How to Save a Life"". Calling the death a "lightning bolt" David Hinckley of New York Daily News wrote, "In one of the most stunning moments from a high-mortality television season, "Grey's Anatomy" [...] killed off Patrick Dempsey's Dr. Derek Shepherd". Also talking about the shock value Shepherd's death in her New York Post review Lindsay Putnam wrote, "“Grey’s Anatomy” did the unthinkable, killing off one of the few remaining original cast members", additionally putting up the question of the future of the series asking, "with Derek out of the picture, what will become of the rest of the Grey Sloan Memorial Hospital family? Is there still a future for Grey’s Anatomy?" The sentiment was echoed by Slate writer Aisha Harris who weighed heavily upon importance of the death and its impact saying that despite the show’s ensemble cast, "Meredith has always remained the central figure of Grey’s, so this death marks a very important turning point in the show". Optimistic of the prospects for the show, she added, "if anyone can come out of this tragedy as a tougher, better character than ever, it’s Meredith Grey."

References

External links
 

2015 American television episodes
Grey's Anatomy (season 11) episodes